The Philippine Tarsier Foundation, Incorporated (PTFI) is a non-profit, non-stock corporation based in Tagbilaran City, Bohol, Philippines, established in 1996 to conserve, promote research and establish a sanctuary for the Philippine tarsier.

Organized by local businessmen in Bohol,  an island of 1.2 million people, the foundation runs an 8.4-hectare (20.7-acre) sanctuary or forest reservation, nestled within a larger protected forest where about a thousand other Philippine tarsier are believed to live, protected by a permanent logging ban.

Conservation program

Programs, projects, and activities

Tarsier research

The Philippine Tarsier Foundation undertakes the collection and cataloguing of all available research materials on the Philippine tarsier from various institutions and agencies in the country and abroad; and the production of information and promotional materials.

Tarsier habitat management
The Foundation has designated approximately 134 hectares as public domain.
To date, the Foundation has acquired 8.4 hectares of land in Canapnapan, Corella, Bohol  for the sanctuary.

Carlito Pizarras serves as the Field Supervisor of the sanctuary, as employee of the foundation, assuming responsibility for the maintenance of the net enclosure and its inmates.

The foundation further coordinates the conduct of reforestation projects and other related activities or initiatives.

Community management
The foundation plans to expand and replicate the program in other areas with Philippine tarsier populations like Mindanao, Leyte, and Samar.

Visitor management
The Tarsier Research and Development Center about 14 km outside the provincial capital, Tagbilaran City, in the town of Corella, Bohol, also serves as visitor center.

Tarsier trail
The tarsier trail begins at the Tarsier Research and Development Center in Barangay Canapnapan, Corella, Bohol and covers a 134-hectare forested area.

Foundation

Board of trustees and officers

On April 17, 1996, the Philippine Tarsier Foundation Inc. was registered with the Philippine Securities and Exchange Commission, with the following prominent Bohol residents listed as incorporators: the Rev. Florante Camacho, SVD, president of the Divine Word College of Tagbilaran; Anos Fonacier, municipal councilor of Panglao, Bohol and resort operator; and Col. (Ret.) Zosimo Angan, businessman. They were later joined by Richard Uy, banker, and Marlito Uy, department store owner. Elected principal officers were Fonacier as chairman; Camacho as president; and Alvarez, who is the only non-Boholano on the board, as executive vice-president.

The executive officers of the Board of Trustees and Officers of the Philippine Tarsier Foundation during its incorporation in 1996 are Fr. Florante S. Camacho, SVD, president; Jesus Alvarez, Executive director; Urbano Lagunay, secretary; Marlito Uy, treasurer; and retired Col. Zosimo Angan as auditor. The Board of Trustees are Anos Fonacier, Chairman;  Richard Uy, Vice Chairman; and  Honorary Chairperson is Secretary Mina Gabor of the Department of Tourism The first Executive Director/Office Manager was Mr. Jovito Danilo C. Nazareno. During his term, the Philippine Tarsier and Wildlife Sanctuary Visitor Center was built and together with Mr. Carlito Pizarras, tarsier trails were established, marketing and promotional activities of the area as an ecotourism destination were introduced and linkages with other environmental organizations and funding agencies were established to support captive breeding and other preservation activities conducted.

Currently, the following are the officers and Board Of Trustees: Chairman, Fr. Florante S. Camacho, SVD; V-Chairman, Mr. Richard T. Uy; President, Atty. Urbano Lagunay; V-President, Mr. Lyndon Angan (resigned - inactive); Secretary, Joannie Mary Cabillo  (Program Officer); Treasurer, Mr. Marlito Uy; Members: Atty. Anos Fonacier; Dr. Irene Arboleda (our researcher/scientist); Mr. Soliman Fonacier; Mayor Jose Tocmo - Municipality of Corella;  and Field Supervisor   Mr. Carlito Pizarras ('the tarsier-man')

Carlito Pizarras

Carlito "Lito" Pizarras, known as the "Tarsier Man",  is the Field Supervisor of the 8.4-hectare Philippine tarsier sanctuary run by the Philippine Tarsier Foundation in Barangay Canapnapan, Corella, Bohol. Hired by the foundation in 1998, he maintains the net enclosure and its 100 Philippine tarsier inmates.  He also serves as a resource person and guide to visitors and researchers at the Research and Development Center.

References

External links
 CITES Appendix I, II and III
 Entry in Primate Info Net

1996 establishments in the Philippines
Conservation and environmental foundations
Organizations based in Bohol
Nature conservation in the Philippines
Animal sanctuaries
Animal welfare organizations based in the Philippines